Odder is a town in Jutland, Denmark. The town is the seat of Odder municipality, and is the biggest town in the municipality. It is located 20 km south of Aarhus and 16 km south-east of Skanderborg. 

Odder is part of Business Region Aarhus, and the East Jutland metropolitan area, and is served by the Odder Line since the line's construction in August 2018.

History 
Odder is first mentioned in 1363 as Oddræth. The town was built up around Odder River (Danish: Odder Å), which cross through the town. By 1850, the town had grown to the population of about 900 people, and was granted a license to hold a market twice a year. Around the same time, an unsuccessful application was made to dig a canal to the north-east coast. 

Odder became a railway town in 1884 when Hads-Ning Herreders Jernbane railway line was established, connecting the city to Hou and Aarhus. In 2018, the  railway stretch became a light rail stretch in the Aarhus light rail.

Odder Museum
Odder Museum is located centrally in Odder, next to Odder Water- and Steam Mill (Danish: Odder Vand- og Dampmølle), which is part of the museum. The museum has 400 m² of exhibitions, mainly focussed on local history. The mill is from 1883 and stands as it did when production stopped in 1955.

Churches
There are 2 lutheran churches in the town of Odder. One is part of the Church of Denmark and the other is an independent church following Grundtvigtianism.

Parish Church
Odder Parish Church (Danish: Odder Sognekirke) is located near the pedestrian street in the town, bordering Odder River to the north. It was built in the later half of the 1100s. The altarpiece is from 1640 and made by Peder Jensen Kolding. It portrays the Last Supper and in front of the two pillars are figures of the evangelists of Luke and John. Models of Matthew and Mark sit on top of the altarpiece. On top of the altarpiece is also a model of the Crucifixion of Jesus. The church's pulpit is from 1590-1600 and the sounding board from 1703. The two church bells are from 1847 and 1854 respectively, and both from Copenhagen. The church once had a turret clock from 1656, but when the clock was unable to be repaired in 1856, the clock was removed and despite the church's desire for a new, a new clock was never acquired.

Grundtvigtianist Independent Church
Odder Grundtvigtianist Independent Church (Danish: Odder Grundtvigske Valgmenighedskirke) is located east of Odder Parish Church, also near the center of the town. It is a church, independent from the Church of Denmark, though largely with the same beliefs. The congregation was founded in 1884 and the church built in 1885 and opened in 1886. The drawings for the church were made by Christen Jensen. The altarpiece displays a young Jesus, and is made by Troels Trier. The organ is from 1899, made by Frederik Nielsen from Aarhus.

Notable residents
Ejler Bille (1910 — 2004), artist
Jane Muus (1919 — 2007), painter
Knud Enggaard (born 1929), politician
Jens Jørn Spottag (born 1957), actor
Kirsten Brosbøl (born 1977), politician
Mette Dencker (born 1978), politician and MF
Morten Nørgaard (born 1990), singer

Sport
Hans Christian Nielsen (1928 — 1990), football player
Niels Fredborg (born 1946), cyclist
Henrik Mortensen (born 1968), football player
Jakob Fenger-Larsen (born 1971), football player
Torben Grimmel (born 1975), sport shooter
Pernille Harder (born 1977), badminton player
Juliane Rasmussen (born 1979), rower
Louise Pedersen (born 1979), handball player
Steffen Ernemann (born 1982), football player
Thomas Mogensen (born 1983), handball player
Thomas Kvist (born 1987), cyclist
Anders Skaarup Rasmussen (born 1989), badminton player
Steffen Jensen (born 1989), rower
Morten Ring Christensen (born 1990), athlete
Mathias Bay-Smidt (born 1996), badminton player

Sources

Sports 
Odder RK (1996)
RK Tacklers (2002)
https://www.odderfodbold.dk/

References

External links

Official municipality website
Castles and manor house in Odder

Municipal seats of the Central Denmark Region
Municipal seats of Denmark
Cities and towns in the Central Denmark Region
Odder Municipality